Joshua Bitter (born 1 January 1997) is a German professional footballer who plays as a right-back for MSV Duisburg.

Career
Bitter moved to MSV Duisburg on 6 June 2019. He made his professional debut for MSV Duisburg in the 3. Liga on 20 July 2019, starting in the home match against Sonnenhof Großaspach. On 26 May 2021, it was announced that he would leave Duisburg at the end of the 2020–21 season. In January 2022, he joined Energie Cottbus. He left Cottbus in the summer of 2022 and re-joined MSV Duisburg.

Career statistics

References

External links

1997 births
Living people
People from Dorsten
Sportspeople from Münster (region)
Footballers from North Rhine-Westphalia
German footballers
Association football fullbacks
Germany youth international footballers
FC Schalke 04 II players
SV Werder Bremen II players
MSV Duisburg players
FC Energie Cottbus players
3. Liga players
Regionalliga players
Oberliga (football) players
21st-century German people